Zhangixalus dugritei is a species of frog in the family Rhacophoridae found in China and Vietnam, and possibly Laos and Myanmar. Its natural habitats are temperate forests, subtropical or tropical moist montane forests, subtropical or tropical seasonally wet or flooded lowland grassland, freshwater marshes, intermittent freshwater marshes, rural gardens, and heavily degraded former forests.

References

dugritei
Amphibians of China
Amphibians of Vietnam
Taxa named by Armand David
Amphibians described in 1872
Taxonomy articles created by Polbot